The following outline is provided as an overview of and topical guide to the fishing industry:

Fishing industry – includes any industry or activity concerned with taking, culturing, processing, preserving, storing, transporting, marketing or selling fish, fish products or shellfish. It is defined by the FAO as including recreational, subsistence and commercial fishing, and the harvesting, processing, and marketing sectors.

Essence of the fishing industry 

 Fishing industry
 Commercial fishing
 Fish farming
 Fish processing
 Fish products
 Fish marketing
 Fishing by country
 Fishing communities
 Fishing banks
 Other areas
 World fish production
 Work in Fishing Convention 2007
 Sustainable fishery

Commercial fishing
 Commercial fishing
 Trawling
 Seine fishing
 Longline fishing
 Troll (angling)
 Scallop dredge
 Trepanging
 Lobster fishing
 Alaskan king crab fishing
 Artisan fishing
 Fishing vessel
 Blast fishing

Trawling

 Trawling
 Pair trawling
 Bottom trawling
 Midwater trawling
 Commercial trawler
 Naval trawler
 recreational

Fish processing
 Fish processing
 Fish processing facility
 Factory ship
 Fish preservation
 Slurry ice
 Fish flake
 Gibbing
 Dried and salted cod
 Stockfish
 Dried shrimp
 Allan McLean

Fish products
 Fish products
 Seafood
 Roe
 Fish meal
 Fish emulsion
 Fish hydrolysate
 fish oil
 fish sauce
 Seafood
 Edible crustaceans
 Edible mollusks

Fish marketing
 Fish marketing
 Live food fish trade
 shrimp marketing 
 Fish market
 Chasse-marée

Fish markets
 Fish market
 Billingsgate Fish Market
 Fulton Fish Market
 Maine Avenue Fish Market
 Princes Street Market (Cork)
 Scania Market
 Tsukiji fish market

Fish types
 Fish (food)
 Finfish
 Shellfish
 Crustaceans
 Echinoderms
 Mollusks
 Demersal fish
 Bottom feeder
 Groundfish
 Whitefish
 Oily fish
 Rough fish

Commercial finfish
 Anchovy
 Beluga sturgeon
 Catfish
 Cod
 Atlantic cod
 Eel
 Eel history
 Halibut
 Herring
 Mackerel
 
 Salmon
 Sardine
 Sole
 Sturgeon
 White sturgeon
 Tilapia
 Patagonian toothfish
 Tuna
 Turbot
 Whitebait
 More commercial finfish...

Commercial crustaceans
 Crab fisheries
 Crayfish fisheries
 Krill
 Lobster fisheries
 Shrimp fishery

Commercial molluscs
 Shellfish
 Abalone
 Clam
 Cockles
 Periwinkle
 Mussels
 Oysters
 Scallops
 Whelk

Fishing by country
 Fishing by country
 Alaska
 Angola
 Bangladesh
 Canada
 Chad
 Chile
 Ghana
 Ethiopia
 India
 Israel
 Japan
 Scotland
 Uganda

Fishing communities
 Bhoi
 Cullercoats
 Gilleleje
 Hovden
 Kolis
 Macassan contact with Australia
 Mogaveeras
 Polperro
 Culture of Póvoa de Varzim
 St. Abbs
 Sørvágur
 Tilting
 Food of the Tlingit
 more...

Fishing disasters
 Stotfield fishing disaster
 Eyemouth disaster
 Moray Firth fishing disaster
 2004 Morecambe Bay cockling disaster
 1959 Escuminac Hurricane
 1996 Jorlinda R. Digal

Fishing banks
 Agulhas Bank
 Chatham Rise
 Dogger Bank
 Flemish Cap
 Georges Bank
 Grand Banks
 Hawkins Bank
 Macclesfield Bank
 Nazareth Bank
 Princess Alice Bank
 Saya de Malha Bank
 Soudan Banks

Fishing industry organizations

Fishing industry trade unions 
 Fish, Food and Allied Workers Union
 Fishermen's Protective Union
 Grimsby Steam and Diesel Fishing Vessels Engineers' and Firemen's Union
 Humber Amalgamated Steam Trawler Engineers and Firemen's Union
 National Union of British Fishermen
 Scottish Seafishers' Union
 United Fishermen and Allied Workers' Union
 United Fishermen's Union

Fishing industry publications

Persons influential in the fishing industry

See also 
 Outline of agriculture
 Outline of fishing
 Outline of fisheries

References

External links 

FAO Fisheries Information
World Fishing Today, news from fishing industry 
Fish database (FishBase)
 American Fisheries Society
 NOAA Fisheries Service
One Fish
The Sunken Billions: The Economic Justification for Fisheries Reform

 
Fishing industry
Fishing industry